Auerbach is a village in the municipality Horgau near Augsburg (13 km) in the district of Augsburg, in Swabia - Bavaria, southern Germany.

External links 
  History of Auerbach - (Horgau)
  Map of Auerbach - (BayernViewer) 

Augsburg (district)